(born 29 July 1979) is a Kazakh politician. He is an äkim of Atyrau Region.

Biography

Early life and education 
Şapkenov was born in the village of Karatobe. In 2000, he graduated from West Kazakhstan State University as an economist and mathematician and was lecturer there until 2001.

Career 
From 2001, Şapkenov worked as a leading specialist of the Environmental Protection Fund and Directorate of Nature Management of the Äkimat of West Kazakhstan Region. In 2002, he became a leading and chief specialist of the Finance Department until being appointed as the head of the Department of Economics and Budget Planning, head of the Department, deputy director of the Department of Agriculture of the West Kazakhstan Region in 2006. From 2007, Şapkenov was the deputy head of the Department of Economics and Budget Planning before becoming the head again in 2009. 

In January 2012, Şapkenov was appointed as the deputy äkim of West Kazakhstan Region. He served the post before becoming the first deputy äkim on 27 August 2012. From January 2015, he worked as State Inspector of the Department of State Control and Organizational and Territorial Work of the Administration of the President of the Republic of Kazakhstan until 14 July 2016, when he was appointed as the äkim of Atyrau. On 28 June 2018, Şapkenov became the first deputy äkim of Atyrau Region. He was eventually dismissed on 22 May 2020 and was subsequently appointed as Vice Minister of Labour and Social Protection of the Population on 4 June 2020. 

2021 - 2022 - Labour and Social Protection of the Population Minister

References 

1979 births
Living people
People from West Kazakhstan Region
Nur Otan politicians
Government ministers of Kazakhstan